Délio dos Santos (died 1 September 2020) was a Brazilian politician who served as a Deputy. He was lawyer of political prisoners during Getúlio  Vargas's dictatorship.

References

1920s births
2020 deaths
Brazilian politicians